This is a list of common atlas and gazetteer abbreviations. These abbreviations are not always used consistently between publications; some terms have fallen out of use over time. Older gazetteers and atlases often neglect to define abbreviations and underlying terms. Gazetteer and map abbreviations can show up in several forms: upper or lower case, with or without periods, sometimes with hyphens (e.g., Post Village may be P.V., PV, p.v., or p-v).

This list doesn't include direction headings (e.g., N. or No. for north, etc.), which are generally clear.

References

See also
Administrative division

Geography-related lists
Geography terminology
Types of populated places
Gazetteers